Ted Burgmeier (November 8, 1955 – July 7, 2013) was an American football defensive back. He played for the Kansas City Chiefs in 1978.

He died of heart failure on July 7, 2013, in East Dubuque, Illinois at age 57.

References

1955 births
2013 deaths
American football defensive backs
Notre Dame Fighting Irish football players
Kansas City Chiefs players